Uncommon Productions, LLC is an independent film company based in Boston, Massachusetts and Los Angeles, California. Founded in 2000 by Bill Haney and Tim Disney, Uncommon's films tend to focus on social issues. Recent films include cancer immunotherapy documentary, Jim Allison: Breakthrough, mountain top removal documentary The Last Mountain featuring Robert Kennedy Jr., and the NAACP Image Award nominated drama American Violet about drug enforcement, starring Alfre Woodard and Charles S. Dutton.

In 2007 the owners of a Dominican Republic sugar plantation sued the company for defamation because of the way they were portrayed in the Uncommon Productions film The Price of Sugar. As of 2010 the lawsuit had not been settled.

Filmography

Documentaries
Jim Allison: Breakthrough (2019), which won the "Golden Owl" award at the Bergen International Film Festival
The Last Mountain (2011), which received the Pare Lorentz Award
The Price of Sugar (2007), which won the Emerging Visions audience award at SXSW
A Life Among Whales (2005)
Racing Against the Clock (2004)
Gift of the Game (2002), which won the "Best of the Festival" award at the Woods Hole Film Festival

Feature films
William (2019)
American Violet (2008)
Crusade: A March Through Time (2006)
Tempesta (2005)
A Question of Faith (2000)

References

External links 
 

Film production companies of the United States